Baron Imre Czobor de Czoborszentmihály (1520 – 8 June 1581) was a Hungarian noble and statesman, who served as Palatinal Governor of Hungary from February 1572 to 8 June 1581.

His daughter was Erzsébet Czobor, the second wife of Palatine György Thurzó.

References

Sources
 Markó, László: A magyar állam főméltóságai Szent Istvántól napjainkig – Életrajzi Lexikon p. 219. (The High Officers of the Hungarian State from Saint Stephen to the Present Days – A Biographical Encyclopedia) (2nd edition); Helikon Kiadó Kft., 2006, Budapest; .

1520 births
1581 deaths
Barons of Hungary
Imre